Abdul Razzak Yaqoob  (7 May 1944 – 21 February 2014) was a Pakistani gold bullion trader who founded ARY Gold in the United Arab Emirates and later ARY Media Group.

Early life
He was born in Surat, British India to Memon family in 1944 which later migrated to Karachi after partition.

Business career
Yakoob moved to the United Arab Emirates in the 1960s and started gold business with an outlet in Dubai. He founded ARY Group in 1972 and launched a private television channel ARY Digital in 2000.

He was associated with the ARY Gold bribery case in which he paid a bribe to then Prime Minister of Pakistan  Benazir Bhutto to get exclusive rights to import and trade gold in Pakistan. In January 1994, Schlegelmilch established a British Virgin Island based named Capricorn Trading, with Zardari as its owner.

Death
He died on 21 February 2014 in London, United Kingdom.

References

1944 births
2014 deaths
Pakistani company founders
Pakistani industrialists
Pakistani expatriates in the United Arab Emirates
Bribery scandals
Government of Benazir Bhutto
ARY Digital Network people
Memon people
Pakistani people of Gujarati descent
Businesspeople from Dubai
Businesspeople from Karachi
Pakistani Muslims
Pakistani mass media owners